Nir Levine (born March 4, 1962) is an Israeli former football player, former caretaker manager of Maccabi Tel Aviv, and former director of football of Maccabi Tel Aviv youth team. In 2019 he was appointed as the coach of the Israel national under-21 football team.

Biography
Levine was born in Rehovot, Israel.

He played forward in soccer for Hapoel Marmorek, Hapoel Petah Tikva, K.A.A. Gent, Bnei Yehuda, Hapoel Jerusalem, Maccabi Kiryat Gat, and Hapoel Ashkelon, and at the 1985 Maccabiah Games Levine won a gold medal with Team Israel. 

Levine has managed Hapoel Petah Tikva, Ironi Ashdod, Tzafririm Holon, Maccabi Tel Aviv, Hapoel Haifa, Hapoel Be'er Sheva, Hapoel Tel Aviv, and the Israel national under-21 football team. 

From 2016 to 2019, Levine was the technical manager of the youth Israeli national teams. In March 2019 he was appointed as the coach of the Israel national under-21 football team.

Honours
As player
Toto Cup (1):
1985–86
Israel State Cup (1):
1992

As coach
Israel State Cup (3):
2001, 2002, 2007

References

External links

1962 births
Living people
Competitors at the 1985 Maccabiah Games
Israeli footballers
Israeli Jews
Liga Leumit players
Hapoel Marmorek F.C. players
Hapoel Petah Tikva F.C. players
K.A.A. Gent players
Bnei Yehuda Tel Aviv F.C. players
Hapoel Jerusalem F.C. players
Maccabi Kiryat Gat F.C. players
Hapoel Ashkelon F.C. players
Israeli Premier League players
Maccabiah Games footballers
Maccabiah Games gold medalists for Israel
Israel international footballers
Israeli expatriate footballers
Expatriate footballers in Belgium
Israeli expatriate sportspeople in Belgium
Israeli football managers
Hapoel Petah Tikva F.C. managers
Maccabi Ironi Ashdod F.C. managers
Hapoel Tzafririm Holon F.C. managers
Maccabi Tel Aviv F.C. managers
Hapoel Haifa F.C. managers
Hapoel Be'er Sheva F.C. managers
Hapoel Tel Aviv F.C. managers
Footballers from Rehovot
Association football forwards
Israeli Footballer of the Year recipients